Masjid al-Hisn ("The Fortress Mosque") was built between 717 and 720 CE by the Umayyad caliph Umar II, as part of his conversion of Mopsuestia (in present-day southeastern Turkey) into a military base to shield Antioch from a potential Greek attack.

A cistern within the structure was inscribed with Umar's full name, Umar ibn-'Abd-al-'Aziz. The building fell into ruin during the reign of al-Mu'tasim, approximately 120 years later.

References

Former mosques in Turkey
8th-century mosques
Umayyad architecture
Al-Awasim
8th-century establishments in the Umayyad Caliphate